Suseo-dong is a ward of Gangnam-gu in Seoul, South Korea. The name, Suseo originated from the feature of Han River running through the western part of the region.  Suseo-dong is also home to the Tancheon park.

Education
Schools located in Suseo-dong:
 Seoul Wangbuk Elementary School
 Seoul Suseo Elementary School
 Daewang Middle School
 Suseo Middle School
 Daejin Design High School
 Seoul Sejong High School

See also 
Dong of Gangnam-gu

References

External links 
  Official site

Neighbourhoods in Gangnam District